Frank Casper (born 9 December 1944) is an English former professional football player, coach and manager, born in Barnsley. As a player, he made nearly 400 appearances in the Football League as a striker for Rotherham United and Burnley. He went on to coach at and then manage Burnley.

Career
Casper made his Rotherham United debut against Derby County in 1962.

He transferred to Burnley in June 1967 for a fee of £30,000, which was the first significant purchase by the club since the 1959 signing of Alex Elder. He scored on his Burnley debut against Coventry City, went on to score five goals in his first five games with the club, and became the club's top scorer in each of his first two seasons. With the departure first of Willie Irvine, then of Andy Lochhead, he was left without a regular forward partner. During the 1970–71 season, he was sidelined through injury for half the season and the Clarets were relegated from the top flight.

Through the early to mid-1970s, Frank continued to be a major focus of the Clarets' attack and forged a successful partnership with Paul Fletcher, with the two helping the club gain promotion back to Division One in 1972–73. Casper's first team appearances were limited after an injury sustained at Leeds United in 1974, and early in 1976 he made his last first team appearance at Norwich before retiring and joining the Turf Moor staff as youth team coach. In all he spent around 20 years with Burnley, first as a very successful striker, then as a coach, caretaker manager in 1983, and manager from 1989 to 1991.

He also had a spell as assistant manager at Bury, alongside former teammate Martin Dobson.

His son Chris was also a professional footballer and football manager.

References

External links
 
 Stats and photo at Sporting Heroes

1944 births
Living people
Footballers from Barnsley
English footballers
Association football forwards
Burnley F.C. players
Rotherham United F.C. players
English Football League players
English football managers
Burnley F.C. managers
English Football League representative players
Bury F.C. non-playing staff